Laetilia loxogramma is a species of snout moth in the genus Laetilia. It was described by Staudinger in 1870. It is found on the Canary Islands and mainland Spain.

References

Moths described in 1870
Phycitini